This is a list of awards and nominations earned by American rock band Alice in Chains.

As of 2019, Alice in Chains has received eleven Grammy nominations.  Their first nomination was for the song "Man in the Box", nominated for Best Hard Rock Performance in 1992. The album Dirt was nominated in the same category in 1993. Six more songs were nominated between 1995 and 2011. The album Jar of Flies was nominated for Best Recording Package in 1995. The Devil Put Dinosaurs Here was nominated for Best Engineered Album, Non Classical in 2014, and the album Rainier Fog was nominated for Best Rock Album in 2019.

The music video for the song "Would?", Alice in Chains' contribution to the 1992 film Singles, won the award for Best Video from a Film at the 1993 MTV Video Music Awards. In 2009 they won the Kerrang! Icon award, and in 2010 they won two Revolver Golden Gods awards for Black Gives Way to Blue.

American Music Awards
The American Music Awards is an annual awards ceremony created by Dick Clark in 1973.

|-
| style="text-align:center;"|  || Alice in Chains || Favorite New Heavy Metal/Hard Rock Artist || 
|-

Billboard Music Awards
The Billboard Music Awards is an annual awards ceremony held by Billboard magazine.

|-
| style="text-align:center;"| 1994 || "No Excuses" || Top Rock Song ||

Concrete Foundations Awards
The Concrete Foundations Awards was an awards ceremony held by the Foundations Forum to recognize the significant contributions made by key artists to the heavy metal genre and the music industry as a whole.

|-
| style="text-align:center;"| 1991 || Facelift || Best Debut Album ||

Fryderyk Awards
The Fryderyk Awards is an annual awards ceremony held by the Polish Society of the Phonographic Industry.

|-
| style="text-align:center;"| 2010 || Black Gives Way to Blue || Best Foreign Album ||

GAFFA Awards

Denmark GAFFA Awards
The GAFFA Awards is an annual awards ceremony established in 1991 by the Danish magazine of the same name.

|-
| rowspan="2"| 1993
| rowspan="2"| Alice in Chains
| Best Band
| 
|-
| Best Concert
| 
|-
|}

Sweden GAFFA Awards
The GAFFA Awards (Swedish: GAFFA Priset) are awarded by the Swedish magazine of the same name since 2010.

|-
| 2019
| Alice in Chains
| Best Foreign Band
| 
|-
|}

Grammy Awards
The Grammy Awards are awarded annually by the National Academy of Recording Arts and Sciences.

|-
| style="text-align:center;"| 1992 || "Man in the Box" ||rowspan="2"|Best Hard Rock Performance With Vocal || 
|-
| style="text-align:center;"| 1993 || Dirt || 
|-
| rowspan="2"| 1995 || Jar of Flies || Best Recording Package ||
|-
| "I Stay Away" ||rowspan="6"|Best Hard Rock Performance ||
|-
| style="text-align:center;"| 1996 || "Grind" || 
|-
| style="text-align:center;"| 1997 || "Again" || 
|-
| style="text-align:center;"| 2000 || "Get Born Again" || 
|-
| style="text-align:center;"| 2010 || "Check My Brain" || 
|-
| style="text-align:center;"| 2011 || "A Looking in View" || 
|-
| style="text-align:center;"| 2014 || The Devil Put Dinosaurs Here || Best Engineered Album, Non Classical || 
|-
| style="text-align:center;"| 2019 || Rainier Fog || Best Rock Album ||

Juno Awards
The Juno Awards are presented by the Canadian Academy of Recording Arts and Sciences.

|-
| align="center"|  || Randy Staub (for "Hollow") || Juno Award for Recording Engineer of the Year || 
|-

Kerrang! Awards
The Kerrang! Awards is an annual awards ceremony held by Kerrang!, a British rock magazine.

|-
| style="text-align:center;"| 1996 || Alice in Chains || Classic Songwriter Award || 
|-
| style="text-align:center;"| 2009 || Alice in Chains || Icon Award ||

Loudwire Music Awards
The Loudwire Music Awards is an annual awards ceremony held by Loudwire, an American music website.

|-
| align="center" rowspan="5"| 2014 || Alice in Chains || Rock Band of the Year || 
|-
| | The Devil Put Dinosaurs Here|| Rock Album of the Year || 
|-
| | Jerry Cantrell || Guitarist of the Year || 
|-
| rowspan="2" | "Hollow" || Rock Song of the Year || 
|-
| | Rock Video of the Year || 
|-

Metal Hammer Golden Gods Awards
The Metal Hammer Golden Gods Awards is an annual awards ceremony held by Metal Hammer, a British heavy metal magazine.

|-
| style="text-align:center;"| 2013 || Alice in Chains || Icon Award ||

Metal Storm Awards
The Metal Storm Awards is an annual awards held by Metal Storm, an Estonian heavy metal magazine.

|-
| align="center" rowspan="2"| 2009 || rowspan="2"|Black Gives Way to Blue || Best Alternative Metal Album || 
|-
| Biggest Surprise || 
|-
| 2013 || The Devil Put Dinosaurs Here || Best Alternative Metal Album || 
|-
| 2018 || Rainier Fog || Best Alternative Metal Album || 
|-

MoPOP Founders Award
The MoPOP Founders Award is an annual awards ceremony held by the Museum of Pop Culture in Seattle.

|-
| style="text-align:center;"| 2020 || Alice in Chains || Founders Award ||

MTV Movie Awards
The MTV Movie Awards is an annual awards ceremony established in 1992 by MTV.

|-
| style="text-align:center;"| 1993 || "Would?" from Singles || Best Song from a Movie || 
|-

MTV Video Music Awards
The MTV Video Music Awards is an annual awards ceremony established in 1984 by MTV.

|-
| style="text-align:center;"|  || "Man in the Box" || Best Heavy Metal/Hard Rock Video || 
|-
| style="text-align:center;"|  || "Would?" from Singles || Best Video from a Film || 
|-
| style="text-align:center;"|  || "Again" || Best Hard Rock Video || 
|-

Northwest Area Music Awards
The Northwest Area Music Awards (NAMA) was an awards ceremony held by the Northwest Area Music Association. Alice in Chains received nine nominations in 1991 and won one award. The other eight nominations are unknown.

|-
| style="text-align:center;"| 1991 || Facelift || Best Recording || 
|-
| style="text-align:center;"| 1992 || Alice in Chains || Best Rock Group ||

Revolver Golden Gods Awards
The Revolver Golden Gods Awards is an annual awards ceremony held by Revolver, an American hard-rock and heavy metal magazine.

|-
| align="center" rowspan="2"| 2010 || Black Gives Way to Blue || Album of the Year || 
|-
| | Alice in Chains || Comeback of the Year || 
|-
| align="center" rowspan="2"| 2014 || "Hollow" || Song of the Year || 
|-
| | Jerry Cantrell || Dimebag Darrell Best Guitarist(s) Award ||

SPIN's Readers' Poll Awards
The SPIN's Readers' Poll is an awards held annually by American music magazine SPIN.

|-
| style="text-align:center;"| 1993 || Dirt || Best Album ||

See also
 List of awards and nominations received by Jerry Cantrell

References 

Awards
Lists of awards received by American musician
Lists of awards received by musical group